{{DISPLAYTITLE:C28H50}}
The molecular formula C28H50 (molar mass: 386.69 g/mol, exact mass: 386.3913 u) may refer to:

 Campestane (24R-methylcholestane)
 Ergostane (24S-methylcholestane)